"Never Again" is a song by Swedish singer Tomas Ledin from his tenth studio album, The Human Touch (1982).

Overview
Although Ledin was a well-known figure in Sweden, he was relatively unknown outside of the country. Stig Anderson, the owner of Polar Music and manager of the band ABBA, believed in Ledin's singing ability and wanted to promote him across the continent. Upon hearing "Never Again", Anderson thought this song would make a good duet, and suggested ABBA's Agnetha Fältskog to record the song with him.

Although a duet, Ledin and Fältskog were not together in the studio when they laid down their vocal tracks.

Release and reception
Released as a single, "Never Again" peaked at No. 2 in Sweden and was also a top-10 entry in Norway and Belgium. Ledin and Fältskog also recorded a Spanish version of the song entitled "Ya Nunca Más".

The song was originally released on Tomas Ledin album 1982 The Human Touch. It was later included as a bonus track on the reissue of Fältskog's album Wrap Your Arms Around Me and on a number of her compilation albums.

Charts

References

1982 singles
1982 songs
Agnetha Fältskog songs
Male–female vocal duets
Polar Music singles
Songs written by Tomas Ledin
Tomas Ledin songs